Hamarkənd (also, Amarkend) is a village and municipality in the Yardymli Rayon of Azerbaijan.  It has a population of 722.  The municipality consists of the villages of Hamarkənd and Zəngəran.

References 

Populated places in Yardimli District